The Newfoundland Herald was a weekly news and entertainment magazine available throughout Newfoundland and Labrador, Canada that was published in St. John's. 

The magazine was founded in 1946 by the late Geoff Stirling of Stirling Communications International. It was sold at convenience stores, supermarkets, and through door-to-door delivery every Monday when the print edition ended in September 2022.

Founded as The Sunday Herald on May 12, 1946, the Herald was originally a tabloid newspaper with, in Stirling's words, "a little something for everyone."

After Stirling's CJON-TV (now better known as NTV) came on the air, the publication's focus gradually shifted towards celebrity and entertainment features, as it switched to a magazine format. The Herald frequently cross-promoted sister media outlets NTV and OZFM.

On September 21, 2022, the Newfoundland Herald announced it would be closing and the website would active for archival purposes. The final print edition was for the week of September 25 to October 1, 2022.

References

External links
 The Newfoundland Herald

Weekly magazines published in Canada
Entertainment magazines published in Canada
News magazines published in Canada
Magazines established in 1946
Mass media in Newfoundland and Labrador
Television magazines
Listings magazines